Akadema is a privately owned sporting goods manufacturing company located in Hawthorne, New Jersey . The company was founded by brothers, Joseph and Lawrence Gilligan of Ringwood, New Jersey Lawrence was a former Minor League player for the St. Louis Cardinals. The company specializes in manufacturing baseball gloves.

History
The first series of gloves were released in 1998 under the name "Academy."   In 2000 the company experienced rapid growth when it changed its name to Akadema, moved into the old Yoo-hoo factory in Garfield, NJ, and released the patented Reptilian Glove. Akadema signed Ozzie Smith as the company spokesman and then Anthony Telford and Clay Bellinger became the first Major League Players endorsing Akadema. Kris Totten (a former Minor League player for the Seattle Mariners) joined the firm to head up sales.   
 
The company would follow up the Reptilian with the Claw, The Funnel and Spiral Lock,  Tacktion Grip,  The Hot Hands and the UFO Mitt  to continue the companies first decade in creative sports design. The most popular of the patented glove however has been the Praying Mantis Mitt which was created with input from Gary Carter.
 
The company crossed over into popular culture when their products appeared in Adam Sandler films such as Click, Benchwarmers and the Billy Bob Thornton remake of Bad News Bears.  Akadema also has been a sponsor of Spike TV programs "Pros vs Joes" and "DEA" second season.

Sponsorship
Akadema's most important and visible endorsement deals have been the signing of Manny Ramirez from 2004-2011 and a five-year deal with future star Bryce Harper.   Shane Victorino has won three Gold Glove Award trophies since signing on with Akadema.   Akadema's other current endorsements are with: Bobby Jenks,  Brandon Moss, Jose Veras, Tim Redding, Mark Melancon, Vin Mazzaro, Ross Ohlendorf,  Vicente Padilla, Brandon McCarthy, Darnell McDonald, Derek Holland, Willie Eyre, Cameron Maybin, and Craig Breslow. Akadema also became strong within the women's fast pitch market. They have sponsored Crystl Bustos 2000-2010 and Monica Abbott of Team USA 2008-2010 and are an official supplier to USA softball Olympic team and the National Pro Fast Pitch League.  
 
As the pro ranks grew, the Akadema brand spread quickly and became very popular among Minor League and college level players.
 
In addition to modern gloves, Akadema introduced the Hoboken Collection, a vintage line of equipment that had been used by Babe Ruth, Lou Gehrig, Bob Feller, Dazzy Vance, Mickey Cochrane and Yogi Berra. Akadema quickly gained rights to 
Ken-Wel and Reach companies trademarks.

Manufacturing
Akadema started manufacturing through suppliers overseas but unlike most manufacturers of the day, Akadema has brought some manufacturing in house to the USA. Akadema started its own wood baseball bat shop and can customize a bat. Two years later the company opened its own embroidery shop. This year the company started its own baseball glove shop making it one of the few companies that still makes wood bats, metal bats and gloves in the USA. In 2008 the company purchased an industrial building and consolidated its operations under one roof in Hawthorne, NJ. According to Inc. magazine, 2007 sales were 4.8 million. Current sales are said to be around seven million.

References

External links
 Company website
 Akadema at Baseballgloves.com

Sporting goods manufacturers of the United States
Companies based in Passaic County, New Jersey
Gloves
Hawthorne, New Jersey